Kevin Diks Bakarbessy (born 6 October 1996) is a Dutch professional footballer who plays as a full-back for Danish Superliga club F.C. Copenhagen.

Club career

Vitesse
Born  in Apeldoorn, Diks joined Vitesse's youth setup in 2005, aged nine, after playing for VIOS Vaassen and hometown's AGOVV Apeldoorn. In the 2014 summer he was called to the main squad for the pre-season, also appearing in a 1–3 defeat against Chelsea. On 24 August 2014, after profiting from first-choice Wallace's injury, Diks made his first-team – and Eredivisie – debut, starting in a 1–2 away loss against PEC Zwolle. On 8 January of the following year, after being already a permanent part of the main squad, he renewed his link until 2018.

Fiorentina
On 6 July 2016, Diks joined Serie A side Fiorentina on a five-year deal after impressing at Vitesse. He later requested number 34 shirt in tribute to Abdelhak Nouri, who collapsed and suffered brain damage, ending his career.

On 23 October 2016, three months after signing for the Italian side, Diks finally made his long-awaited debut in a 5–3 away victory against Cagliari, replacing Cristian Tello in the 88th minute.

Vitesse (loan)
On 31 January 2017, Diks returned to Vitesse on loan for the remainder of the 2016–17 campaign, after failing to make his breakthrough whilst in Italy. On 11 February 2017, Diks made his Vitesse return in their 2–0 home defeat against Willem II, playing the full 90 minutes. On 5 April 2017, Diks got sent off for a second bookable offence during Vitesse's 1–0 away victory against Heracles Almelo.

He came off the bench as Vitesse won the final of the KNVB Beker 2–0 against AZ Alkmaar on 30 April 2017 to help the club, three-time runners up, to the title for the first time in its 125-year history.

Feyenoord (loan)
On 4 July 2017, Diks joined Feyenoord on a season-long loan.

On 22 April 2018, he played as Feyenoord won the 2017–18 KNVB Cup final 3–0 against AZ Alkmaar.

Empoli (loan)
On 31 January 2019, Diks joined Serie A side Empoli on loan until 30 June 2019.

AGF (loan)
On transfer deadline day, 2 September 2019, Diks was loaned out to Danish Superliga club AGF for the 2019–20 season. On 31 August 2020, the loan was renewed for the 2020–21 season.

FC Copenhagen
On 5 July 2021, Diks returned to Denmark, signing a four-year deal with F.C. Copenhagen.

International career
On 9 October 2014, Diks made his Netherlands U19 debut in a 7–0 victory against Andorra U19's, playing the first half before being replaced by Leeroy Owusu. Diks went on to make three more appearances before receiving a call-up to the under-20 squad. Diks has also represented at under-21

Personal life
Diks is the younger brother of Jamarro, who had a spell in the Slovakian league.
He is of Indonesian descent.

Career statistics

Club

Honours
Vitesse
 KNVB Cup: 2016–17

Feyenoord
 Johan Cruijff Shield: 2017
 KNVB Cup: 2017–18

Copenhagen
Danish Superliga: 2021–22

References

External links
Vitesse profile 

1996 births
Living people
Sportspeople from Apeldoorn
Association football fullbacks
Dutch footballers
Dutch people of Indonesian descent
Dutch people of Moluccan descent
Netherlands under-21 international footballers
Netherlands youth international footballers
Footballers from Gelderland
SBV Vitesse players
ACF Fiorentina players
Empoli F.C. players
Feyenoord players
Aarhus Gymnastikforening players
F.C. Copenhagen players
Eredivisie players
Serie A players
Danish Superliga players
Dutch expatriate footballers
Expatriate footballers in Italy
Dutch expatriate sportspeople in Italy
Expatriate men's footballers in Denmark
Dutch expatriate sportspeople in Denmark